The Gambler Who Wouldn't Die (lit. "I've been looking for you in all the obituaries") is an English/Italian dramatic film directed by Giancarlo Giannini.

Plot
Nikita is an Italian taxi driver who runs over a footballer in an accident and is forced to emigrate to Canada and make a new life. He finds work as a driver for a company of undertakers. One evening, he plays poker in a remote villa outside Toronto. To pay off his gambling debt, a manhunt is proposed: with guns in hand, his creditors will have 20 minutes to hunt him down and kill him. If he survives, Nikita will be considered to have paid his debt.

Production

Development
Giannini has said that the idea for the film arose by chance at a dinner, when he was told about such manhunts taking place in Africa.

The film was produced by Magalì Production, Dean Film and RAI Cinema, with contribution from the Italian Ministry of Cultural Heritage and Activities. In 2013 it was presented at the Shanghai International Film Festival.

Filming
The film was shot in Italy, Canada and the United States.

References

External links

2013 films
2013 drama films
Films set in Canada
Italian drama films
2010s Italian-language films
English-language Italian films
2010s English-language films